This is a list of scheduled monuments in the district of Bolsover in the English county of Derbyshire.

In the United Kingdom, a scheduled monument is a "nationally important" archaeological site or historic building that has been given protection against unauthorised change by being placed on a list (or "schedule") by the Secretary of State for Culture, Media and Sport; English Heritage takes the leading role in identifying such sites. Scheduled monuments are defined in the Ancient Monuments and Archaeological Areas Act 1979 and the National Heritage Act 1983. There are about 20,000 scheduled monument entries on the list, which is maintained by English Heritage; more than one site can be included in a single entry.

While a scheduled monument can also be recognised as a listed building, English Heritage considers listed building status as a better way of protecting buildings than scheduled monument status. If a monument is considered by English Heritage to "no longer merit scheduling" it can be descheduled.

Derbyshire has over 500 scheduled monuments including many stone cairns, stone circles, barrow burial mounds, lead mining relics, ancient settlements, and over 20 bridges.

See also
Scheduled monuments in Derbyshire
Scheduled monuments in Amber Valley
Scheduled monuments in Chesterfield
Scheduled monuments in Derby
Scheduled monuments in Derbyshire Dales
Scheduled monuments in the Borough of Erewash
Scheduled monuments in High Peak
Scheduled monuments in North East Derbyshire
Scheduled monuments in South Derbyshire
Grade I listed buildings in Derbyshire
Grade II* listed buildings in Bolsover (district)

References

Bolsover
Bolsover District
Archaeological sites in Derbyshire
History of Derbyshire
Bolsover District